A recombinant virus may occur naturally or be produced by recombining pieces of DNA using recombinant DNA technology.

Synthetic recombination 

This may be used to produce viral vaccines or gene therapy vectors.

Natural recombination 

The term is also used to refer to naturally occurring recombination between virus genomes in a cell infected by more than one virus strain. This occurs either by Homologous recombination of the nucleic acid strands or by reassortment of genomic segments. Both these and mutation within the virus have been suggested as ways in which influenza and other viruses evolve. An example of a recombinant virus is Western equine encephalitis virus (WEE), which is a recombinant virus between two other closely related yet distinct encephalitis viruses. In addition, reassortment is most important for pandemic influenza viruses.

See also
 Reassortment
 Mutation
 Chromosomal crossover

References
 Recombination Resulting in Virulence Shift in Avian Influenza Outbreak, Chile. Suarez et al 2009
 Homologous Recombination as an Evolutionary Force in the Avian Influenza A Virus. He at al 2008

External links
 Dr. Jeffery Taubenberger on: A Recombinant Virus
 Viral Genetics
 Transmission of Influenza A Viruses Between Animals and People

Virology
Influenza